Cartes  is a municipality located in the autonomous community of Cantabria, Spain.

Cartes or variant, may also refer to:

People
 Horacio Cartes (born 1956), a Paraguayan businessman and president of Paraguay
 Luis Cartés (born 1998), a Uruguayan soccer player
 Roberto Cartes (born 1972), a former Chilean footballer

Other uses
 Grupo Cartes, a Paraguayan business conglomerate

See also

 
 Descartes (disambiguation), including des Cartes
 Cartesian (disambiguation)
 Carte (disambiguation)
 Cart (disambiguation)